John Dutton (born September 20, 1975) is a former Arena Football League quarterback. He was drafted out of University of Nevada, Reno in the 6th round of the 1998 NFL Draft by the Miami Dolphins. In 2005, he led the Crush to the ArenaBowl XIX title. In 2006, he was on the cover of the EA Sports first AFL video game, Arena Football, making him the first player to pose for the cover. He had been the backup quarterback for the San Jose SaberCats behind Mark Grieb. After Grieb's suffered a season-ending injury earlier in the year, Dutton quarterbacked the SaberCats to a 52–14 victory over the Arizona Rattlers in ArenaBowl XVI. He was named Offensive Player of the Game for his performance. In June 2009, Dutton was signed by the RiverCity Rage of the Indoor Football League. On February 12, 2010, it was announced that Dutton had been signed by the Cleveland Gladiators.

Early years
Dutton attended Fallbrook Union High School in Fallbrook, California, and was a letterman in basketball and football. In football, he passed for 2,056 yards and ten touchdowns as a senior. Dutton then played college football for the Texas Longhorns, but was only a backup to starting quarterback James Brown. He later transferred to Nevada, and played for the Nevada Wolf Pack. Dutton helped the Wolf Pack win two Big West championships, and the 1996 Las Vegas Bowl.

Professional career

Miami Dolphins
Dutton was selected by the Miami Dolphins in the 6th round of the 1998 NFL Draft. He was released during the Dolphins' training camp.

Atlanta Falcons
Dutton was picked up in training camp by the Atlanta Falcons, but never played in a game.

Cleveland Browns
In 1999, Dutton was signed by the Cleveland Browns, but was placed on injured reserve after breaking his ankle. .

San Jose SaberCats
After being placed on the IR, Dutton signed to play in the Arena Football League where he was the backup quarterback for the San Jose SaberCats behind Mark Grieb. After Grieb suffered a season-ending injury earlier in the year, Dutton quarterbacked the SaberCats to a 52–14 victory over the Arizona Rattlers in ArenaBowl XVI. He was named Offensive Player of the Game for his performance.

Colorado Crush
In 2005, he led the Crush to the ArenaBowl XIX title. In 2006, he was on the cover of the EA Sports AFL video game, Arena Football.

RiverCity Rage
When the Arena Football League suspended play in 2009, Dutton was signed by the RiverCity Rage of the Indoor Football League.

Cleveland Gladiators
On February 12, 2010 it was announced that Dutton had been signed by the Cleveland Gladiators.

San Antonio Talons
In March 2013, Dutton was assigned to the San Antonio Talons.  One game into the season, he tore his tendon forcing him out of action and finally retired at season's end.

AFL statistics

Stats from ArenaFan:

Coaching career
John Dutton coached high school football at Linfield Christian School in Temecula, California during the 2004–2005 season. As the quarterback and wide receiver coach, Dutton helped lead Linfield Christian on to a 10–2–1 overall record.   He served as quarterback and running backs coach at College of the Siskiyous in Weed, California in 2015.  Starting in 2017, Dutton became head coach at Mt. Shasta High School in Mt. Shasta, California, where he coached the team to a 1-9 record in his first season.  In 2018, he was named the new head coach at McCloud High School in McCloud, California, coaching 8-man football, their first program in 17 years. In 2021, Dutton joined the varsity football coaching staff at Reno High School in Reno, Nevada.

Missions work
Dutton, his wife Terina and their children served as missionaries in Africa.  They founded The Dutton Family Foundation.

References

External links

 Colorado Crush player page
 John Dutton at 'ArenaFan Online'
 College of the Siskiyous profile

1975 births
Living people
American football quarterbacks
Cleveland Gladiators players
Colorado Crush players
Miami Dolphins players
San Jose SaberCats players
Nevada Wolf Pack football players
RiverCity Rage players
San Antonio Talons players
Texas Longhorns football players
High school football coaches in California
Junior college football coaches in the United States
People from Fallbrook, California
Sportspeople from Newport Beach, California
People from Weed, California
Coaches of American football from California
Players of American football from California